Training and development involve improving the effectiveness of organizations and the individuals and teams within them. Training may be viewed as related to immediate changes in organizational effectiveness via organized instruction, while development is related to the progress of longer-term organizational and employee goals. While training and development technically have differing definitions, the two are oftentimes used interchangeably and/or together. Training and development have historically been topics within adult education and applied psychology but have within the last two decades become closely associated with human resources management, talent management, human resources development, instructional design, human factors, and knowledge management.

History
Aspects of training and development have been linked to ancient civilizations around the globe. Early training-related articles appeared in journals marketed to enslavers in the antebellum south and training approaches and philosophies were discussed extensively by Booker T. Washington. Early academic was publishing related to training included a 1918 article in the Journal of Applied Psychology. This article explored an undergraduate curriculum designed for applied psychologists. Training was also discussed in first handbook on adult education in 1934. World War II influenced the focus of applied psychology research to be on effectiveness of training programs, particularly in military contexts. By the 1960s and 70s, the field began developing theories and conducting theory-based research because up until that point, the field had been rooted in trial-and-error intervention research. This era also brought along the development of new training methods such as the use of computers, television, case studies, and role playing. The scope of training and development also expanded to include cross-cultural training, focus on the development of the individual employee, and the use of new organization development literature to frame training programs. The 1980s marked a shift to focus on how employees were receiving and implementing training programs, and encouraged the collection of data for evaluation purposes, particularly management training programs. The development piece of training and development became increasingly popular in the 1980s and 90s, with employees more frequently being influenced by the concept of "lifelong learning". It was in this decade that research revealing the impact and importance of fostering a training and development-positive culture (including management and co-worker) was first conducted. The turn of the century brought more research in topics such as team-training, for example cross-training. Cross-training emphasizes training in coworkers' responsibilities.

Skills training has taken on varying organizational forms across industrialized economies. Germany has an elaborate vocational training system whereas the United States and the United Kingdom have weak vocational training system.

Training practice and methods
Training and development encompasses three main activities: training, education, and development.

The "stakeholders" in training and development are categorized into several classes. The sponsors of training and development are senior managers. The clients of training and development are business planners. Line managers are responsible for coaching, resources, and performance. The participants are those who actually undergo the processes. The facilitators are human resource management staff. And the providers are specialists in the field. Each of these groups has its own agenda and motivations, which sometimes conflict with the agendas and motivations of the others.

Especially in the last couple decades, training has become more trainee-focused, which allows those being trained more flexibility and active learning opportunities. For example, these active learning techniques include exploratory/discovery learning, error management training, guided exploration, and mastery training. Typical projects in the field include executive and supervisory/management development, new-employee orientation, professional-skills training, technical/job training, customer-service training, sales-and-marketing training, and health-and-safety training. Training is particularly critical in high-reliability organizations, which rely on high safety standards in order to prevent catastrophic damage to employees, equipment, or the environment (e.g. nuclear power plants, operating rooms).

It is important to note that all employees require different levels and types of development in order to fulfill their job role in the organization. All employees need some type(s) of training and development on an ongoing basis to maintain effective performance, or to adjust to new ways or work, and to remain motivated and engaged. The instructional systems design approach (often referred to as ADDIE model) is great for designing effective learning programs and used for instructional design. Instructional design is the process of designing, developing and delivering learning content. There are 5 phases in the ADDIE model: (1) needs assessment, (2) program design, (3) program development, (4) training delivery or implementation, and (5) evaluation of training.

Analyze - problem identification, (TNA) training needs analysis, target audience determined, stakeholder's needs identified, identify the resources required.

Design - learning intervention/implementation outline and mapped, mapping evaluation methods.

Development - determine delivery method, production of learning product that is in line with design, determine instructional strategies/media/methods, quality evaluation of the learning product, development of communication strategy, development of required technology, development and evaluation of assessments and evaluation tools.

Implement - participation in side-programs, training delivery, learning participation, implementation of a communication plan, evaluation of business, execution of formal evaluations.

Evaluation - (integral part of each step) formal evaluation, continuous learning evaluation, evaluation of business, potential points of improvement.

There are many different training methods that exist today, including both on and off-the-job methods. On-the-job training methods happen within the organization where employees learn by working alongside co-workers in ways such as coaching, mentorship, internship, apprenticeship, job rotation, job instructional technique (JIT), or by being an understudy.  To contrast, off-the-job training methods happen outside the organization where employees attend things such as lectures, seminars, and conferences or they take part in simulation exercises like case studies and role-playing. It could also include vestibule, sensitivity or transactional training activities. Other training methods include:

Apprenticeship Training: system of training in which a worker entering the skilled trades is given thorough instruction and experience, both on and off the job, in the practical and theoretical aspects of the work.

Co-operative programs and internship programs: training programs that combine practical, on-the-job experience with formal education. Typically these programs are offered at colleges and universities.

Classroom instruction: information can be presented in lectures, demonstrations, films, and videotapes or through computer instruction. (This includes vestibule training where trainees are given instruction in the operation of equipment.)

Self-Directed Learning: individuals work at their own pace during programmed instruction. Including books, manuals, or computers to break down subject-matter content into highly organized, logical sequences that demand a continuous response on the trainee's part.

Audiovisual: methods used to teach the skills and procedures required for a number of jobs.

Simulation: used when it is not practical or safe to train people on the actual equipment or within the actual work environment.

E-learning: training that uses computer and/or online resources. Such as CBT (computer-based training), videotapes, satellites and broadcast interactive TV/DVD/CD-ROM.

The benefits of training employees are increased productivity and performance in the workplace, uniformity of work processes, reduced supervision and reduced wastage, promoting employees from within, improving organizational structure and designs, boosting morale, better knowledge of policies and organization's goals, improved customer valuation and improved/updated technology. There is significant importance in training as it prepares employees for higher job responsibilities, shows employees they are valued, improves IT and computer processes, and tests the efficiency of new performance management systems. However, contrarily some individuals believe training is a waste of time and money because in certain cases real life experience may trump education, and organizations want to spend less, not more.

Principles 
When a company puts its employees through training programs, it must ensure that they are efficient and relevant to the employees' tasks in the organization as it is estimated that only 20-30% of training given to employees are used in the month later. To help mitigate this issue, some general principles should be followed to increase employees desire to take part in the program. These include:

 Self-efficacy: These means to increase the learners belief that they can fully comprehend the teachings. 
 Attitude: An uncooperative attitude towards learning could hinder the individual's capability to grasp the knowledge being provided. 
 Competence: This is the skill an individual develops that enables them to make good decisions in an efficient manner.
 External motivators: These are the behaviours individuals present when a reward or extrinsic goal is given to them.

Motivation is an internal process that leads to an employee's behaviour and willingness to achieve organizational goals. Creating a motivational environment within an organization can help ensure employees achieve their highest level of productivity. Motivation can create an engaged workforce that enhances individual and organizational performance. The model for motivation is represented at the most basic level by motivators separated into two different categories:

 Intrinsic factors: These represent the internal factors to an individual, such as the difficulty of the work, achievement recognition, responsibility, opportunity for meaningful work, involvement in decision making, and importance within the organization.
 Extrinsic factors: These are external factors to the individual, such as job security, salary, benefits, work conditions, and vacations.

Both intrinsic and extrinsic motivators link to employee performance in the workplace. A company's techniques to motivate employees are continually changing and evolving. Finding out what motivates employees can help businesses determine why people work specific ways and perform at varying levels.

There are many basic training and development principles in human resource management. For instance, performance feedback is important as managers can use it to identify the employee's lack of skills in areas of the job and their approach to improving that weakness while maintaining behaviour.

Traditional constructive feedback, also known as weakness-based feedback, can often be viewed as malicious from the employees’ perspective. When interpreted negatively, employees lose motivation on the job, which affects their level of production. The other kind of feedback that is more effective is known as strengths-based feedback. This feedback is more effective because it is easier to adjust the performance once the individual can separate flaws from strengths. The strengths-based feedback is positive feedback that allows the employees to recognize their strengths and further improve their performance with that knowledge. Using this strategy as a base for constructive feedback shows support and encouragement towards the employee, which boosts their confidence. Confidence in the workplace allows individuals to stay focused and engaged. However, the disadvantage of strengths-based feedback is failing to perform at one's full potential due to overconfidence.

Reinforcement is another critical principle of employee training and development. By positively reinforcing employees with encouragement or reward, managers can establish a desired pattern of behaviour. Studies have shown that reinforcement directly influences employee learning, which is highly correlated with performance after training. Reinforcement based training emphasizes the importance of communication between managers and trainees in the workplace. The more the training environment can be a positive, nurturing experience, the more—and faster—attendees are apt to learn.

Another essential aspect of reinforcement-based training is to discuss what has been taught in a training session and how employees can apply what they have learned to the job. This can be done by conducting pre and post-training brainstorming sessions.  

Overall, managers play a significant role in reinforcing learning by systematically looking for ways to notice and thank the employee when they use the skills and knowledge from the training session. By positively reinforcing employees like this, they will become more comfortable in the workplace and more confident in their abilities, which ultimately positively affects their future performance.

Benefits 
Training has been used in organizations for the past several decades. Although training and development requires investments of many types, there are cited benefits to integrating training and development into organizations:

 Increased productivity and job performance 
 Skills development 
Team development 
Decreasing safety-related accidents 

However, if the training and development is not strategic and pointed at specific goals, it can lead to more harm than good.  Needs assessments, especially when the training is being conducted on a large-scale, are frequently conducted in order to gauge what needs to be trained, how it should be trained, and how extensively. Needs assessments in the training and development context often reveal employee and management-specific skills to develop (e.g. for new employees), organizational-wide problems to address (e.g. performance issues), adaptations needed to suit changing environments (e.g. new technology), or employee development needs (e.g. career planning). The degree of effectiveness of training and development programs can be predicted by the needs assessment and how closely the needs were met, the execution of the training (i.e. how effective the trainer was), and trainee characteristics (e.g. motivation, cognitive abilities). Effectiveness of training is typically done on an individual or team-level, with few studies investigating the impacts on organizations.

Occupation 
The Occupational Information Network (O*NET) cites training and development specialists as having a bright outlook, meaning that the occupation will grow rapidly or have several job openings in the next few years. Related professions include training and development managers, (chief) learning officers, industrial-organizational psychologists, and organization development consultants. Training and development specialists are equipped with the tools to conduct needs analyses, build training programs to suit the needs of the organization by using a variety of training techniques, create training materials, and execute and guide training programs.

See also 

Andragogy - The theory of adult learning

References

Further reading 
 
 
 
 
 Thelen, Kathleen. 2004. How Institutions Evolve: The Political Economy of Skills in Germany, Britain, the United States, and Japan. Cambridge University Press.

Human resource management
Organizational performance management
Training
Learning
Applied psychology
Personal development